The Royal Embassy of Saudi Arabia in Washington, D.C. is the Kingdom of Saudi Arabia's main and largest diplomatic mission to the United States. It is located at 601 Jamal Khashoggi Way, Washington, D.C., in the Foggy Bottom neighborhood, near the Watergate complex, and Kennedy Center.

Ambassadors

Jamal Khashoggi Way
In 2021, Advisory Neighborhood Commission 2A voted to rename the street in front of the embassy, New Hampshire Avenue NW, to "Jamal Khashoggi Way", following the assassination of Saudi Arabian journalist Jamal Khashoggi.

See also
 Saudi Arabia–United States relations
 Ambassadors of Saudi Arabia to the United States
 Ambassadors of the United States to Saudi Arabia

References

External links

Embassy of Saudi Arabia - Washington, D.C. Contact Info

Saudi Arabia
Washington, D.C.
Foggy Bottom
Saudi Arabia–United States relations